The 2019 Indian general election were held in India between April and May 2019 to constitute the 17th Lok Sabha.

Surveys and Polls

Vote share

Seat projections

Candidates

Trinamool Congress
On 12 March 2019, party president Mamata Banerjee announced the party candidates for the election. 41% of the candidates were women. Notable exclusions from the list were the party's general secretary Subrata Bakshi and Sugata Bose. Bose did not get permission from Harvard University, where he is a professor, to contest the election. Notable inclusions were Bengali actresses Mimi Chakraborty and Nusrat Jahan.

List of candidates

Party-wise Result

Lok Sabha seats that flipped from All India Trinamool Congress to Bharatiya Janata Party 
Bangaon
Alipurduars
Balurghat
Bankura
Barrackpore
Bishnupur
Cooch Behar
Jalpaiguri
Hooghly
Medinipur
Ranaghat
Purulia

Lok Sabha seats that flipped from Indian National Congress to All India Trinamool Congress 
Jangipur

Lok Sabha seats that flipped from Indian National Congress to Bharatiya Janata Party 
Maldaha Uttar

Lok Sabha seats that flipped from Communist Party of India Marxist to Bharatiya Janata Party 
Raiganj

Lok Sabha seats that flipped from Communist Party of India Marxist to All India Trinamool Congress 
Murshidabad

Constituency-wise Results

Alipurduars

Arambagh

Asansol

Baharampur

Balurghat

Bangaon

Bankura

Barasat

Bardhaman Purba

Bardhaman-Durgapur

Barrackpore

Basirhat

Birbhum

Bishnupur

Bolpur

Cooch Behar

Darjeeling

Diamond Harbour

Dum Dum

Ghatal

Hooghly

Howrah

Jadavpur

Jalpaiguri

Jangipur

Jaynagar

Jhargram

Kanthi

Kolkata Dakshin

Kolkata Uttar

Krishnanagar

Maldaha Dakshin

Maldaha Uttar

Mathurapur

Medinipur

Murshidabad

Purulia

Raiganj

Ranaghat

Sreerampur

Tamluk

Uluberia

Impact
There has been a major political shift from the left to the right in the 2019 general elections in West Bengal. The Statesman says, “Making an aggressive penetration in Bengal for the first time since its inception in 1980, BJP alone has dramatically increased its vote share close to 40 percent this time. Thus, it has virtually made the CPI-M into a mere marginalised political party and at the same time the saffron party set a strong challenge before the Trinamool Congress hardly two years ahead of the Assembly elections scheduled in 2021 in the state.” This obviously is the most important impact of the general elections in the state visible in the voting pattern right across the state, irrespective of who won or lost a particular seat.

Analysis

Assembly segments wise lead of Parties

Postal Ballot wise lead of Parties 

TMC won 3 out of 3 assembly seats in the next assembly by-elections in November 2019. Even the seat of State BJP president Dilip Ghosh which fell vacant due to Dilip Ghosh's win in Loksabha election, Kharagpur Sadar was won by TMC by a lead of 22,000 votes. TMC was trailing in that seat by 158,000 votes in 2019 general elections.

Region-Wise Results

References

External links 

West
Indian general elections in West Bengal
2010s in West Bengal